The Rama Pir Mandir is a Hindu temple dedicated to Ramdev Pir in Tando Allahyar in Sindh, Pakistan. The annual Ramapir Mela festival is the second largest Hindu pilgrimage in Pakistan, after the annual Hinglaj yatra, which is the largest Hindu pilgrimage in Pakistan.

Legend
The temple was built in 1859, three and a half centuries after the demise of Ramdev Pir in 1459 AD. According to a legend, a Hindu man in Tando Allahyar took a vow that if he was blessed with a child, he will arrange a Mela (fair) of Rama Pir in Tando Allahyar. As his wish was fulfilled, he brought an earthen lamp from the original temple of Rama Pir in Ramdevra in today's Rajasthan, India to Tando Allahyar in today's Pakistan and built a temple here.

In the mela carrying "Dajja (dwaja) " (flags) in their hands, they recite "Bhajans" whole night sitting outside the city and early in the morning at 5:00 AM they hoist "Dajja (dwaja)" at the temple by dancing on the beat of drums and trumpets. Thousands of devotees, including men, women and children, travel on foot to pay homage to Rama Pir. They bring flags (Dwaja) which are hoisted at the temple. Although Ramdev ji alias Rama Pir, a Hindu saint of 14th century, was cremated in Rajasthan, but he had come to Tando Allahyar and his devotees had constructed a temple in his memory at the place where he had worshiped as far back as 1800. Since then, a fair is held at the Rama Pir temple by his devotees every year.

Rampir Mela

The annual Ramapir Mela occurs in 3 days. Thousands of devotees make pilgrimage to the temple bare footed.

See also

 Hinduism in Pakistan
 Hinglaj Mata mandir
 Prahladpuri Temple, Multan
 Sadh Belo
 Shiv Mandir, Umerkot

References

Hindu temples in Karachi
Heritage sites in Karachi